Ivan Markov may refer to:

 Ivan Markov (Ataman) (died 1926), Ukrainian military commander
 Ivan Markov (weightlifter) (born 1988), Bulgarian weightlifter
 Ivan Markov (wrestler) (born 1984), Russian professional wrestler